The Rev. William Corby, CSC (October 2, 1833 – December 28, 1897) was an American priest of the Congregation of Holy Cross, and a Union Army chaplain in the American Civil War attached to the Irish Brigade.  He served twice as president of the University of Notre Dame.

Biography

He was born in Detroit, Michigan, to Daniel Corby, an Irish immigrant, and his wife Elizabeth, a Canadian. He attended public school until age 16, then joined his father's real estate business.  In 1853, he enrolled in the 10-year-old college of Notre Dame in South Bend, Indiana, and began study for the priesthood three years later. Following ordination, he taught at Notre Dame, and served as a local parish priest.

Irish Brigade
Corby left his position at Notre Dame and joined the predominantly Catholic Irish Brigade in 1861. He spent the next three years as chaplain of the 88th New York Infantry, which was one of the five original regiments in the Irish Brigade. His memoir of the Irish Brigade became a best-seller.

During the battle of Antietam he rode back and forth along the lines of the Brigade, while shouting absolution to the men, of whom 540 became casualties before the recall order was given.

He is perhaps best known for giving general absolution to the Irish Brigade on the second day of the Battle of Gettysburg. Of the Brigade's original 3,000 men, only about 500 remained. Of the men Father Corby absolved that day, 27 were killed, 109 were wounded, and 62 were listed as missing.

The scene of Fr. Corby blessing the troops was depicted in the 1891 painting Absolution under Fire by Paul Wood, and dramatized in the 1993 film Gettysburg.

A statue by Samuel Murray – Father Corby, with right hand raised in the gesture of blessing – stands upon the same boulder on which the priest stood while blessing the troops that morning. It was the first statue of a non-general erected on the Gettysburg Battlefield, and was dedicated in 1910.

He is widely remembered among military chaplains and celebrated by Irish-American fraternal organizations. Corby Hall at Notre Dame is named for him, and a copy of the Gettysburg statue stands outside the building. An organization of Notre Dame alumni is named The William Corby Society.

President of the University of Notre Dame
Following his service in the Civil War, he returned to Notre Dame and served as its vice-president, 1865–66; and president twice, 1866–72 and 1877-81. Under Corby's first administration, enrollment at Notre Dame increased to more than 500 students. In 1869 Corby opened the law school, which offered a two-year course of study, and in 1871 he began construction of Sacred Heart Church, today the Basilica of the Sacred Heart, Notre Dame. The institution was still small, and Corby taught in the classroom and knew most students and faculty members. In 1869, the entire student body and the faculty presented him with the gift of a 'black horse and, when he left the presidency three years later, they presented him with a matching carriage.

Corby became president again following the short term of Fr. Patrick Colovin. When Corby returned to the presidency, Notre Dame had not yet become a significant academic institution. Corby's presidency saw the April 1879 fire that destroyed the old Main Building of the school. Corby sent all students home and promised that they would return to a "bigger and better Notre Dame." Corby overcame the $200,000 fire loss and rebuilt the Main Building - which now stands with its "Golden Dome." During his administration, he also constructed Washington Hall (then named Music Hall), in which he took much pride, and started the construction of St. Edward's Hall for the minims program. In addition to his presidency, he was serving as the Holy Cross Provincial, when Fr. Sorin, who had become Superior General of the Congregation, wrote to him to tell him that he would have to relinquish one of his positions. Corby wanted to remain president, but was overruled by Sorin.
Famous throughout the U.S. Catholic world as chaplain for the Irish Brigade, known as the "Fighting Irish," it may be that the nickname followed Father Corby back to Notre Dame, where it stuck.

See also
 Roman Catholic Archdiocese for the Military Services, USA#Chaplains in Civil War

References

Sources
 Bergen, Doris L. (ed.). The Sword of the Lord: Military Chaplains from the First to the Twenty-First Century. Notre Dame, IN: University of Notre Dame Press, 2004. .
 Corby, Fr. William, CSC. Memoirs of Chaplain Life: Three Years with the Irish Brigade in the Army of the Potomac. Edited by Lawrence F. Kohl. New York: Fordham University Press, 1992.

External links

Father William Corby from Irish Cultural Society of the Garden City Area.
 William Corby Archives from University of Notre Dame.

Presidents of the University of Notre Dame
Irish Brigade (U.S.)
Union Army chaplains
Congregation of Holy Cross
American people of Irish descent
Clergy from Detroit
1833 births
1897 deaths
American people of Canadian descent
19th-century American Roman Catholic priests